The Shreveport Area Transit System, commonly known as SporTran, is a public transportation bus system based in Shreveport, Louisiana, United States.  It runs bus routes in Shreveport and Bossier City, Louisiana.  All bus routes converge at the Intermodal Facility near Downtown Shreveport.

SporTran provides public transportation in the form of buses and lift vans. SporTran is one of the oldest public transportation systems in the south. SporTran has been in continual service for over 125 years with only one interruption due to the strike of 1957.

SporTran operates seven days a week on 17 bus routes from 6:00 a.m. to 1:00 a.m., with shorter operations on the weekends.  As of 2006, SporTran operates night service on five routes (mostly supplementing daytime service after end of service) between 8:00 p.m. and midnight Monday through Saturday with no service on Sundays.

SporTran has a fleet of over 50 buses equipped to handle all passengers, including those with disabilities. Their newest buses are equipped with the emission reduction systems and an experimental dual-fuel (Hybrid) bus was placed in service in 2005.

No fares are charged within city limits since 2020, but will apply if outside.

Facilities

Downtown Terminal
Address: 1237 Murphy St, Shreveport LA 71104
Coordinates: 
Facilities: All routes connect at this downtown bus terminal, which was opened in 1986

Bus Garage
Address: 1115 Jack Wells Boulevard, Shreveport 

Facilities: Shreveport Transit Management office and bus maintenance

Routes

References

External links
 Official website
 New (as of Nov., 2014) Syncromatics®-based GPS-driven mobile/desktop live per-stop arrival times and live maps, with trip planning coming soon

Bus transportation in Louisiana
Transportation in Shreveport, Louisiana